The 20th AARP Movies for Grownups Awards, presented by AARP the Magazine, honored films and television shows released in 2020 and were announced on March 4, 2021. The awards recognized films and television shows created by and about people over the age of 50. Because of the COVID-19 pandemic, that year's awards also included films from the first two months of 2021, and there was no in-person ceremony. Instead, Hoda Kotb hosted a virtual ceremony produced by Great Performances on PBS, which aired on March 28, 2021.

This was the first year that the program included a slate of awards recognizing achievement in television, and the first to include any awards for television since the elimination of the award for TV Movie after 2005. The nominations were announced on February 8, 2021.

Awards

Winners and Nominees

Winners are listed first, highlighted in boldface, and indicated with a double dagger.

Career Achievement Award
 George Clooney: "He personifies aging with grace, and he proves that with smarts and hard work, even extraordinary talent can improve with time. Clooney, who turns 60 this year, is a slam-dunk argument against ageism."

Films with multiple nominations and awards

References 

AARP Movies for Grownups Awards
AARP
AARP